Senator Gillette may refer to:

Francis Gillette (1807–1879), U.S. Senator from Connecticut
Guy Gillette (1879–1973), U.S. Senator from Iowa

See also
Senator Gillett (disambiguation)